Barry West (24 October 1958 – 15 December 2022) was an English professional snooker player.

Biography
West was born on 24 October 1958, and became a professional snooker player in 1985. He reached the last 32 of a ranking tournament on fifteen occasions, the last 16 five times, and progressed to three quarter-finals.

In the 1985 UK Championship, West lost 9–1 in the quarter-final to Steve Davis; the 1988 International Open finished in a 5–2 loss to Jimmy White, and the UK Championship of that year ended for West with a 9–5 defeat to Terry Griffiths. He also reached the semi-final of the 1988 English Professional Championship, losing 9–6 to Neal Foulds.

In the early 1990s, West fell to 66th in the world rankings at the end of the 1992–93 season; he finished the 1996/1997 season ranked 179th, and was relegated from the tour aged 38.

West made a return to competition in qualifying for the 2010 World Championship, but was defeated at his first attempt, 5–1 by Del Smith. He entered the 2012 World Seniors Championship, winning three matches to qualify for the last 16, where he lost 2–0 to Dene O'Kane, and latterly played in the 2013 event, but lost his first match 2–1 to Les Dodd.

West died in December 2022, at the age of 64.

References

1958 births
2022 deaths
English snooker players